The NHS Care Records Service is a service provided by NHS Connecting for Health for the National Health Service in England.

The project describes its objectives as follows:

External links
NHS Care Records website

Electronic health records
Government databases in the United Kingdom
Medical databases in the United Kingdom
National Health Service (England)